Johann Rudolf, Count Chotek of Chotkow and Wognin (18 May 174826 August 1824) was an Austrian finance minister and government president (Gubernialpräsident) in the Kingdom of Bohemia.

Life

Johann Rudolf was born at Vienna, Habsburg monarchy, the only son of Johann Karl, Count Chotek of Chotkow and Wognin (1704–1787) and Countess Anna Maria Kottulinsky of Kottulin and Krzizkowitz (1711–1798).

In 1770 he served in the Lower Austrian government, and in 1776 he was Councilor at the chancellery. In 1788, he allegedly resigned on account of his health, but in fact did so because of his poor relationship with the  Holy Roman Emperor, Joseph II.

Under the reign of Joseph II's successor Leopold II, in 1790 he was appointed president of the newly-constituted Finanzhofstelle. In 1793 he was dismissed, but in 1802 was elevated to Minister of State and Supreme Burgrave of Bohemia. He particularly superintended road construction, and established factories with English looms and spinning machines. From 1805 to 1809 he was a member of the ministry conference after the Treaty of Schönbrunn, President of the normal political Hofkommission in legislative matters.

In 1808, he was awarded the Order of the Golden Fleece.

Marriage and family
On 18 May 1772, in Vienna, Johann Rudolf married Countess Maria Sidonia of Clary and Aldringen (1748–1824), second daughter of Franz Wenzel, 1st Prince of Clary and Aldringen, and his wife, Countess Josepha of Hohenzollern-Hechingen.

They had eight children:
Count Johann Chotek of Chotkow and Wognin (1773 – 1824), married in 1779 to Countess Maria Isabella of Rottenhan; had issue.
Count Josef Chotek of Chotkow and Wognin  (1776 – 1809), married in 1802 to Princess Maria Sophie of Auersperg; had issue.
Countess Louise Chotek of Chotkow and Wognin (21 June 1777 – 8 March 1864), married in 1802 to Karl Joseph, 3rd Prince of Clary-Aldringen; had issue.
Count Wenzel Chotek of Chotkow and Wognin  (???? – 1807)
Count Ferdinand Chotek of Chotkow and Wognin  (8 September 1781 – 5 September 1836), Prince-Archbishop and Duke of Olmütz.
Karl, Count Chotek of Chotkow and Wognin (23 July 1783 – 18 December 1868), married in 1817 to Countess Marie Berchtold, Baroness of Ungarschitz; had issue.
Countess Theresa Chotek of Chotkow and Wognin (1785 – ????)
Count Hermann Chotek of Chotkow and Wognin (1786 – 1822), married to Countess Henriette Brunswick of Korompa; had issue.

Ancestry

Notes and sources
Genealogisches Handbuch des Adels, Fürstliche Häuser, Reference: 1956
Chotek, Rudolf Graf . In: General German Biography (ADB). Band 4, Duncker & Humblot, Leipzig 1876, S. 138. Volume 4, Duncker & Humblot, Leipzig 1876, p. 138
Chotek John Rud. Graf. In: Austrian Biographical Dictionary 1815-1950 (ABL). Volume 1, published by the Austrian Academy of Sciences, Vienna 1957, p. 146
Chotek . In: Meyers Lexikon- fourth. Edition. Volume 4, Bibliographisches Institut, Leipzig 1885-1892, p. 79
Baron Roman Prochazka : Genealogical Handbook extinct Mr. Bohemian-class families. Degener & Co, Neustadt (Aisch) 1973, S. 57. Degener & Co, Neustadt (Aisch) 1973, p. 57
Adam Wolf: Count Rudolf Chotek, KK Austrian heads of state and ministers conference. In: Proceedings of the philosophical-historical class of the Imperial Academy of Sciences 9, 1852, p. 435-437.
Ivo Cerman: Chotkove. Pribeh urednicke slechty. Lidove noviny, Prag 2008, . p. 301-448.

1748 births
1824 deaths
Johann Rudolf
Nobility from Vienna
Austrian people of Czech descent
Knights of the Golden Fleece of Austria
Politicians from Vienna